Stephen Gillers is a professor at the New York University School of Law. He is often cited as an expert in legal ethics.

Biography
After graduating from Brooklyn College with a B.A. in 1964, he received his J.D. in 1968 from the New York University School of Law.

Gillers' political activism includes calling on then-presidential candidate John Kerry in 2004 to name former U.S. President Bill Clinton as his running mate in a New York Times op-ed.

Gillers has also been critical of U.S. Supreme Court Justices accepting paid trips to legal seminars.

Gillers annually co-authors Regulation of Lawyers: Statutes and Standards (with Professor Roy Simon of Hofstra).

References

Further reading
 Regulation of Lawyers (7th ed., Aspen L. & Bus. 2005). 
 

Living people
New York University School of Law faculty
American legal scholars
Year of birth missing (living people)
Brooklyn College alumni